The Woman Who Came Back is a 1945 horror film directed by Walter Colmes and starring John Loder, Nancy Kelly, and Otto Kruger. The film concerns an offbeat woman who becomes convinced that she is a witch, a conclusion which eventually leads to mass hysteria in the town to which she has recently returned.

Plot
Lorna Webster (Nancy Kelly) is the last descendant of witch-hunter Elijah Webster, who burned fifteen women at the stake for witchcraft. After abandoning her fiancé, local doctor Matt Adams (John Loder), at the altar two years before, Lorna is returning to her New England hometown when the bus  she is riding on crashes. Only twelve out of thirteen victims are recovered. The missing corpse belongs to an old woman who had been wearing a black veil and was sitting next to Lorna when the bus lost control.

After a series of strange incidents, including a bouquet of flowers wilting at her touch, Lorna begins to believe that a supernatural force is taking control of her life. She begins to study the papers of Elijah Websters and finds a confession that explains a strange pact between a witch and the devil. When the witch dies, her spirit will pass into the body of the nearest young woman, who will gain her dark powers. Lorna believes that she is the latest vessel for the witch's power, the previous being the mysterious old woman whose body was never found.

The local townspeople become suspicious and paranoid, believing that Lorna caused the illness of young Peggy, Matt's niece. Desperate to prove that there is nothing supernatural affecting the town or the woman he loves, Matt discovers the personal journal of Elijah Webster. Inside are the details of how Webster forged confessions of witchcraft to further his political standing. Matt hurries to show Lorna the journal, but finds her house being vandalized by some of the townspeople and Lorna fleeing in hysterical terror. Lorna hallucinates and falls into the river. Matt saves her and, in the process finds the body of the old woman. Now believing that she'd been a victim of superstition, Lorna stays in town and marries Matt.

Cast

Production
The Woman Who Came Back was shot at Chaplin Studios in April 1945. The film was developed under the working title The Web.

Release
The Woman Who Came Back was distributed by Republic Pictures Corp. on December 13, 1945.
It was also released on DVD in 1999.

References

External links

 

1945 films
1945 horror films
American horror films
American black-and-white films
Films about witchcraft
Films directed by Walter Colmes
1940s American films